Avlamir Dirceo Stival (born 5 June 1969), commonly known as Cuquinha, is a Brazilian football coach and former player who played as a midfielder.

Career
Born in Curitiba, Paraná, Cuquinha finished his formation with hometown side Coritiba. Promoted to the first team in 1989, he would only make his first team debut in the following year, but still featured rarely for the side. The remainder of his playing career consisted of one year at Santa Cruz-RS and one year at Brasil de Pelotas before retiring in 1992, aged just 23.

Cuquinha was invited to work with his brother in the end of 1999, becoming his assistant coach ever since. In October 2020, while working at Santos, he acted as an interim coach as Cuca was suspended in a 1–1 Série A away draw against Corinthians. In November of that year, he was again named interim as Cuca tested positive for COVID-19, but he himself also tested positive for the disease shortly after.

Personal life
Cuquinha's older brother Cuca was also a footballer, who notably represented Grêmio and later became a coach. Their elder brother, Amauri, was a central defender who also played professionally.

Career statistics

Coaching statistics

References

External links

1969 births
Living people
Footballers from Curitiba
Association football midfielders
Brazilian footballers
Campeonato Brasileiro Série B players
Coritiba Foot Ball Club players
Futebol Clube Santa Cruz players
Grêmio Esportivo Brasil players
Brazilian football managers
Campeonato Brasileiro Série A managers
CR Flamengo managers
Santos FC managers
Shandong Taishan F.C. non-playing staff